Rawlinsville is a small town containing a hotel, restaurant, fire dept, and town store. Rawlinsville is located within Martic Township in Lancaster County, Pennsylvania, United States.

The town is named after Morgan Rawlin, whose name appears in the 1830 Federal Census.

Unincorporated communities in Lancaster County, Pennsylvania
Unincorporated communities in Pennsylvania